Skytop may refer to:
 Skytop, Pennsylvania
 Skytop, a rock climbing crag at Shawangunk Ridge located on Mohonk Preserve
 Skytop Lounge, an observation car built by the Chicago, Milwaukee, St. Paul and Pacific Railroad